Untersiemau is a municipality in the district of Coburg in Bavaria in Germany.

Geography

Location 
Untersiemau lies about 10 kilometres (6.2 miles) south of Coburg at the eastern edge of Itz Valley.

Subdivisions 
Untersiemau is divided into 9 Ortsteile:
 Birkach am Forst
 Haarth
 Meschenbach
 Obersiemau
 Scherneck
 Stöppach
 Untersiemau
 Weißenbrunn am Forst
 Ziegelsdorf

History 
Untersiemau was first mentioned about 800 as Suome, the name is of Slavic origin.

Transport 
Untersiemau can be reached by car via motorway A 73 Suhl-Coburg-Nuremberg. Untersiemau used to have a station at the Itz Valley Railway, which was lifted in 2005.

References

Coburg (district)